Seagulls Over Sorrento is a 1954 British war drama film made by the Boulting brothers based on the play of the same name by Hugh Hastings. The film stars Gene Kelly and was one of three made by Kelly in Europe over an 18-month period to make use of frozen MGM funds. The cast features John Justin, Bernard Lee and Jeff Richards. It was shot at MGM's Elstree Studios with sets designed by the art director Alfred Junge with location shooting taking place in the Channel Islands. Although the film finished shooting in July 1953, MGM could not release it in the United Kingdom until the play finished its London run, which delayed the film's release for almost a year. It was released as Crest of the Wave in the United States and Canada.

Plot
A small group of British sailors stationed on a Scottish island engaged in top-secret research on a new and dangerous torpedo are joined by a US Navy scientist, Lt. Brad Bradville (Gene Kelly), and his assistants. When several tests of the weapon fail, and men are killed, tensions within the group mount. Bradville must prove that the torpedo can work and win over the British, especially Lt. Rogert Wharton (John Justin), before the Admiralty pulls the plug on the project.

Cast

 Gene Kelly as Lt. "Brad" Bradville (USN)
 John Justin as Lt. Roger Wharton
 Bernard Lee as Able Seaman "Lofty" Turner
 Jeff Richards as Torpedoman 2d Class "Butch" Clelland (USN)
 Sid James as Able Seaman Charlie "Badge" Badger
 Patric Doonan as Petty Officer Herbert
 Ray Jackson as Able Seaman "Sprog" Sims
 Fredd Wayne as Torpedoman 2d Class "Shorty" Karminsky (USN)
 Patrick Barr as Cmdr. Sinclair
 David Orr as Able Seaman "Haggis" Mackintosh
 John Horsley as John Phillips - Medical Officer 
 Lockwood West as 	Curly - Stores Petty Officer 
 Harry Van Engel as 	Able Seaman Dawson 
 John Fabian as	Lieutenant Lane
 Peter Bathurst as 	Geoff
 Martin Boddey as 	Member of Admiralty Board
 Ronald Adam as 	Member of Admiralty Board
 John Rolfe as Wireless Operator

Original play
The original stage play was written by Australian playwright Hugh Hastings and was based on his experiences in World War II. It opened in London's West End on 14 June 1950, and was a hit there, but played for only two weeks on Broadway in New York City. Bernard Lee played the same role in the London stage production.

The play ran for over 1,600 performances in London. Film rights were sold to the Boulting Brothers for £10,000.

Production
Because the play – in which all the characters were British, and the emphasis was more on the enlisted men than in the film – was a hit, MGM retained the title for the film everywhere except in the US and Canada, where the title Crest of the Wave was used.

Although set on a Scottish island, the movie was filmed in Jersey and at Fort Clonque on Alderney in the Channel Islands, with interiors filmed at MGM's British studios at Borehamwood, Elstree. Production took place between 4 May and late July 1953. The corvette monitoring the tests was HMS Hedingham Castle (pennant F386).

Ernesto de Curtis's song "Torna a Sorrento" ("Come Back to Sorrento"), is performed on the concertina by David Orr, and was also used as background music throughout the film.

MGM was contractually obligated not to release the film until Seagulls Over Sorrento finished its West End run, which delayed the film's release until 13 July 1954, almost a year after filming had completed. The film then premiered in New York City on 10 November of that year, and went into general American release on 6 December.

Reception
According to MGM records the film earned $349,000 in the US and Canada and $59,000 elsewhere, resulting in a loss of $58,000.

Filmink magazine wrote that:
The guts of the play – the adventures of ordinary seamen – was still there, but was greatly truncated in order to make room for a whole new plot about the officers conducting the torpedo experiments... [and] a new subplot added about the clash between American and British methods... In hindsight, this was a bad decision. I don’t think there was anything wrong with adding action or even Americans...but taking the focus away from ordinary seamen and emphasising the officers was totally contrary to the DNA of Seagulls Over Sorrento.... The Gene Kelly-MGM Seagulls of Sorrento was a hybrid, part-action film, part-abridged version of the play; audiences sensed it and stayed away. Still, it’s not a bad watch, with pleasing photography and location work, and superb performances from Sid James and Bernard Lee (Lofty).

1960 Australian TV adaptation
The film was adapted for Australian television in 1960.

Scapa
Hastings later did a musical version of his play called Scapa which debuted in London in 1962. It received terrible reviews.

References

Notes

Bibliography

 Johnson, Rob and David Smiedt. Boom-Boom: A Century of Australian Comedy. Sydney, Australia: Hodder & Stoughton, 1999. .

External links
 
 
 
 

1954 drama films
1954 films
British black-and-white films
British war drama films
Submarine films
Metro-Goldwyn-Mayer films
1950s English-language films
Films set in Scotland
Films directed by John Boulting
Films directed by Roy Boulting
British films based on plays
Films scored by Miklós Rózsa
1950s war drama films
Films shot at MGM-British Studios
1950s British films